List of Canadian Sikhs is a list of notable Sikhs from Canada.

Academia and education 

 Harjot Oberoi - Professor of Asian Studies at the University of British Columbia
 Sandeep Singh Brar - Sikh historian, Internet pioneer and photographer
 Sheena Iyengar - Professor of Business in the Management Department at Columbia Business School
 Naranjan Dhalla - Cardiovascular research scientist and Distinguished Professor at the University of Manitoba

Business and the professions 

 Baljit Singh Chadha -     president and founder of Balcorp Limited
 Harbanse Singh Doman - Chairman of Doman Industries
 Jaspal Atwal - Real estate construction, media businesses
 Manjit Minhas - Entrepreneur, television personality
Nav Bhatia - Businessman 
 Spoony Singh - Businessman, known for   establishing the Hollywood Wax Museum
 Vikas Khanna -  Chef, restaurateur, cookbook writer, filmmaker

Charity, community and non-profit 

 Alex Sangha - social worker and documentary film producer and Founder of Sher Vancouver

Film, drama and entertainment 

 Jus Reign - Comedian and YouTube personality
 Kanwer Singh - Sikh Canadian YouTube personality
 Neeru Bajwa - Actress, director and producer associated with Punjabi cinema
 Rupan Bal - YouTuber, actor, director and comedian
 Sunny Leone - Actress and model

Journalism, writers and media 

 Gurjinder Basran - Novelist
 Lilly Singh - YouTuber, comedian, television host and actress 
 Monita Rajpal - CNN International news anchor
 Monika Deol - Entertainment reporter for Citytv in Toronto
 Ranj Dhaliwal - Author
 Rupi Kaur - Poet, writer, illustrator, and performer
 Tara Singh Hayer - Indo-Canadian newspaper publisher
 Harnarayan Singh - Television sportscaster

Music 

 Harbhajan Mann - Punjabi singer, actor and film producer
 Jazzy B - Bhangra singer-songwriter.
 Rup Magon - Singer, songwriter, producer, actor and author 
 Sarbjit Cheema - Actor and singer 
 NAV - Rapper

Politics 

 Amarjeet Sohi - Current Mayor of Edmonton, Former MP, Former Minister of Natural Resources
 Anju Dhillon - MP of Dorval—Lachine—LaSalle and first person of South Asian descent to be elected from the province of Quebec.
 Baljit Singh Gosal -  Former MP of Bramalea—Gore—Malton & Minister of Sport (Canada)
 Bardish Chagger - Former MP of Waterloo
 Bob Saroya - Former MP of Markham—Unionville
 Colin Basran - Former Mayor of Kelowna, British Columbia
 Darshan Kang - Former Member of the Canadian Parliament for Calgary Skyview
 Gulzar Singh Cheema - Former MP & former member of the British Columbia Legislative Assembly for Surrey-Panorama Ridge
 George Chahal - MP of Calgary Skyview
 Gurbax Singh Malhi - Member of the Canadian Parliament for Bramalea - Gore - Malton
 Gurmant Grewal - Member of the Canadian Parliamen for Newton - North Delta
 Gurratan Singh - Former Member of the Ontario Provincial Parliament for Brampton East
 Hardial Bains - Founder of the Communist Party of Canada (Marxist - Leninist)
 Hardeep Grewal - MPP of Brampton East (provincial electoral district)
 Harjit Sajjan - Minister of International Development & Minister Responsible for PacifiCan & MP of Vancouver South
 Harry Bains - Minister of Labour in British Columbia
 Harinder Takhar - Former politician in Ontario, Canada
 Herb Dhaliwal - Former MP of Vancouver South.
 Iqwinder Gaheer - MP of Mississauga-Malton
 Jagmeet Singh - Leader of the New Democratic Party
 Jag Sahota - Former MP of Calgary Skyview
 Jasbir Singh Cheema - Canadian television personality and politician.
 Jasraj Hallan - Conservative Party MP of Calgary Forest Lawn
 Johnder Basran -  First Indo-Canadian elected to mayoral office in Canada
 Kamal Khera - MP of Brampton West
 Kuldip Kular - Former MPP in Ontario, Canada
 Manmeet Bhullar - Former Member of the Legislative Assembly of Alberta 
 Maninder Sidhu - MP of Brampton East
 Moe Sihota - Former President of the British Columbia New Democratic Party
 Navdeep Bains -  Former MP & Minister of Innovation, Science and Economic Development
 Nina Grewal - Conservative Party representing the constituency of Fleetwood - Port Kells
 Parm Bains - MP of Steveston—Richmond East
 Parm Gill -  MPP of Milton and former MP of Brampton—Springdale
 Prabmeet Sarkaria - 1st Associate Minister of Small Business and Red Tape Reduction
 Raminder Gill - Member of the Legislative Assembly of Ontario
 Ramesh Sangha - Former MP of Brampton Centre
 Randeep Sarai - MP for Surrey Centre
 Ravi Kahlon - Parliamentary Secretary for Sport and Multiculturalism of British Columbia
 Ruby Dhalla - First Sikh women to serve in the House of Commons of Canada.
 Ruby Sahota - MP of Brampton North
 Sabi Marwah - Member of the Canadian Senate
 Sonia Sidhu - MP of Brampton South
 Sara Singh - Deputy Leader of the Ontario New Democratic Party
 Sindi Hawkins - Member of the British Columbia Legislative Assembly for Kelowna-Mission
 Sukh Dhaliwal - MP of Surrey—Newton
 Tim Uppal - Deputy Leader of Conservative Party, Minister for State & MP of Edmonton Mill Woods
 Ujjal Dosanjh - 33rd Premier of British Columbia
 Vic Dhillon - Liberal member of the Legislative Assembly of Ontario
 Wally Oppal - Member of the British Columbia Legislative Assembly for Vancouver-Fraserview

Revolutionaries 

 Buckam Singh - Sikh soldier in World War I and early Sikh pioneer to Ontario.
 Mewa Singh Lopoke - Member of the Vancouver branch of the anti-British, revolutionary Ghadar Party

Sports 

 Andrew Kooner - Boxer
 Arjan Bhullar - Mixed martial artist currently signed to ONE Championship
 Arshdeep Bains - Draft Prospect of the Vancouver Canucks
 Jimmy Hansra - Cricketer 
 Jinder Mahal - Professional wrestler currently signed to WWE
 Jujhar Khaira - Professional NHL Player for Chicago Blackhawks
 Manny Malhotra -  Former NHL Player & Former Assistant Coach of Vancouver Canucks
 Nuvraj Singh Bassi - Former defensive tackle in the Canadian Football League
 Robin Bawa - Former NHL Player
 Sim Bhullar - Professional basketball player for Guangxi Rhino

Cause célèbres 

 Jaswinder Kaur Sidhu - Beautician
 T. Sher Singh - Former lawyer

See also 

 Sikhism in Canada
 Sikhism in Greater Vancouver
List of Sikhs
List of British Sikhs

References